Liopeltis stoliczkae is a species of snake in the family Colubridae. The species is native to parts of South Asia and Southeast Asia.

Etymology
The specific name, stoliczkae, is in honor of Moravian zoologist Ferdinand Stoliczka.

Description
The following description of L. stoliczkae is from Malcolm A. Smith (1943):

Maxillary teeth 27 or 28; head distinct from neck, much depressed; snout projecting, twice as long as the eye; nostril very small, in an elongated undivided nasal; loreal squarish, sometimes united with the posterior nasal; eight supralabials, 4th and 5th touching the eye; genials subequal. Scales in 15:15:13 rows. 
Ventrals 148–154; Caudals 116–134; Anals 2.

Greyish above and lighter below with a broad black stripe on the side of the head, extending and gradually fading, on the fore part of the body; a grey stripe on the outer margins of the ventrals and a less distinct and thinner median one present or absent.

Total length: males , tail ; females , tail .

Geographic range
L. stoliczkae is found in Northeast India (type locality: Naga Hills; Sikkim, Assam, Arunachal Pradesh), Myanmar, Laos, and Cambodia.

Habitat
The preferred natural habitat of L. stoliczkae is forest.

Reproduction
L. stoliczkae is oviparous.

References

Further reading
Smith MA (1943). The Fauna of British India, Ceylon and Burma, Including the Whole of the Indo-Chinese Sub-region. Reptilia and Amphibia. Vol. III.—Serpentes. London: Secretary of State for India. (Taylor and Francis, printers). xii + 583 pp. (Liopeltis stoliczkæ, p. 184).
Sclater WL (1891). "Notes on the Collection of Snakes in the Indian Museum, with descriptions of several new species". Journal of the Asiatic Society of Bengal 60: 230–250. (Ablabes stoliczkae, new species, p. 234 + Plate VI, figure 1).
Wall F (1924). "A Hand-list of the Snakes of the Indian Empire. Part 3". Journal of the Bombay Natural History Society 29: 864–878. (Liopeltis stoliczkæ, new combination, p. 864).

Liopeltis
Snakes of Asia
Reptiles of Cambodia
Reptiles of India
Reptiles of Laos
Reptiles of Myanmar
Reptiles described in 1891
Taxa named by William Lutley Sclater